The Adventures of Bullwhip Griffin is a 1967 American Western comedy film directed by James Neilson, produced by Walt Disney Productions, starring Roddy McDowall, Suzanne Pleshette, Hermione Baddeley, and Karl Malden. The film's screenplay, by Lowell S. Hawley, was based on the novel By the Great Horn Spoon! by Sid Fleischman. The songs were written by Richard M. Sherman and Robert B. Sherman and the theme song was written by Mel Leven and George Bruns, the latter of whom also composed the film's score. It was the fifth and final film Neilson directed for Disney.

Plot
In 1849, Jack and Arabella Flagg are orphaned in Boston. Along with family's former butler, Eric Griffin, they stow away aboard a ship bound for San Francisco, where the gold rush has begun. Eric gets work as the ship's cook.

Judge Higgins, a swindler and thief, steals a map to a gold mine belonging to Quentin Bartlett, an actor who is among the ship's passengers. Eric, Jack, and Quentin pursue the crooked judge. Arabella arrives in town and takes a job as a dancehall girl to make ends meet.

Eric encounters a stocky bully, Mountain Ox, and lashes out a punch that flattens him. "Bullwhip" becomes his new nickname. Inspired by the incident, Bullwhip enters a prizefighting match and wins the money. He also wins Arabella's affection. Judge Higgins, caught trying to steal the fight's receipts, quivers behind bars as a lynch mob forms outside.

Cast
 Roddy McDowall as Eric "Bullwhip" Griffin
 Suzanne Pleshette as Arabella Flagg
 Bryan Russell as Jack Flagg
 Karl Malden as Judge Higgins
 Harry Guardino as Sam Trimble
 Richard Haydn as Quentin Bartlett
 Mike Mazurki as Mountain Ox
 Hermione Baddeley as Miss Irene Chesney
 Alan Carney as Joe Turner
 Liam Redmond as Captain Swain 
 Cecil Kellaway as Mr. Pemberton
 Joby Baker as Bandido Leader 
 Parley Baer as Chief Executioner
 Arthur Hunnicutt as Referee
 Dub Taylor as Timekeeper
 Pedro Gonzalez Gonzalez as Bandido
 John Qualen as Barber
 Jimmy MacDonald as Saloon Percussionist

Tony Hancock was cast in this film but was sacked during production due to his erratic behaviour. He was replaced by Richard Haydn.

Reception
Howard Thompson of The New York Times graded the film as "Okay, no more," adding that "as a Western spoof, the picture is slow, overdrawn and tame to the point of gentility. Surely young Disney fans wouldn't have cringed at some slambang, Gold Rush vigor, plus a little 'Ruggles of Red Gap' flavoring." Arthur D. Murphy of Variety called the film "a lively, entertaining comedy spoof of the California Gold Rush era. Zesty direction, wild performances, firstrate production values and broad comedy angles make this Walt Disney production particularly strong for all age audiences." Kevin Thomas of the Los Angeles Times wrote, "Everyone turns in winning performances, but they don't get much help from Lowell S. Hawley's routine script, which too often emphasizes dialog at the expense of action, or from James Neilson's equally pedestrian direction." The Monthly Film Bulletin stated, "A pity that some scenes are played for more than they are worth, but there's enough liveliness here to keep all but the most sophisticated youngsters happy."

The film holds a score of 43% on Rotten Tomatoes based on 7 reviews.

Edits by Disney+ 
Disney+ notes before their version of the film that it was "Edited for content". When Jack is pulled out of the river after Judge Higgins tries to rob his money belt, Jack tells the captain "There's a big man dressed as a coolie, but it's Judge Higgins and he tried to rob me" and the captain replies "Round up all the coolies, and take 'em to the wheel house". Disney+ overdubbed the lines to "There's a big man dressed as some others, but it's Judge Higgins and he tried to rob me" and "Round up all the men, and take 'em to the wheel house".

See also
 List of American films of 1967

References

External links 
 
 
 
 

1967 films
1960s Western (genre) comedy films
American Western (genre) comedy films
Walt Disney Pictures films
Musicals by the Sherman Brothers
1960s English-language films
Films based on American novels
Films based on Western (genre) novels
Films directed by James Neilson
Films produced by Walt Disney
Films scored by George Bruns
Films set in 1848
Films set in San Francisco
Films set in Boston
Films shot in San Francisco
Films shot in California
Films shot in Boston
Films shot in Massachusetts
1967 comedy films
1960s American films